The 2007 Algerian Super Cup is the  6th edition of Algerian Super Cup, a football match contested by the winners of the Championnat National and 2006–07 Algerian Cup competitions. The match was scheduled to be played on 1 November 2007 at Stade 5 Juillet 1962 in Algiers between 2006-07 Championnat National winners ES Sétif and 2006–07 Algerian Cup winners MC Alger.

Match details

References 

2007
Supercup
ES Sétif matches